Hadley Upland is a triangular shaped remnant plateau with an undulating surface, in southern Graham Land, Antarctica. It is bounded by Windy Valley and Martin Glacier, Gibbs Glacier and Lammers Glacier. The existence of this upland was known to the United States Antarctic Service, 1939–41, Finn Ronne and Carl R. Eklund having travelled along Lammers and Gibbs Glaciers in January 1941. The upland was surveyed by the Falkland Islands Dependencies Survey in 1948–50 and 1958, and was named by the UK Antarctic Place-Names Committee after John Hadley, an English mathematician who, at the same time as Thomas Godfrey, independently invented the quadrant (the forerunner of the sextant), in 1730–31.

Features
 Mount Medina

References

Plateaus of Antarctica
Landforms of Graham Land
Fallières Coast